The FT-100 Horus is a Brazilian electrical Miniature UAV designed for short-range surveillance designed in conjunction with the Brazilian Army. The army's FT-100s are to be used to carry out surveillance operations during the Summer Olympic Games in Rio de Janeiro.

FT-100 is the first Brazilian made UAV to have been exported, with three aircraft sold to an undisclosed African military customer. The Brazilian Army operates FT-100 since first quarter 2015.

References

Unmanned aerial vehicles of Brazil
Unmanned military aircraft of Brazil
2010s Brazilian military reconnaissance aircraft
2010s Brazilian military aircraft